The following lists events that happened during 1945 in Southern Rhodesia.

Incumbents
 Prime Minister: Godfrey Huggins

Events
 African railway workers strike
 The African National Council is revived under the leadership of Reverend Thompson Samkange

Births
 July 20 – Simbarashe Mumbengegwi, diplomat and politician
 September 12 – Robson Mrombe, athlete
 Thomas Mapfumo, musician

Deaths

See also

 Years in Zimbabwe

 
Years of the 20th century in Southern Rhodesia
Zimbabwe
Zimbabwe, 1945 In